Cyfeilliog (Old Welsh Cemelliauc, probably d. 927) was Bishop of Ergyng (Archenfield in English) and probably Gwent in south-east Wales. He is recorded by the mid-880s in the Llandaff Charters and in 914 he was captured by the Vikings and ransomed by Edward the Elder, King of the Anglo-Saxons, for 40 pounds. He is probably the author of a cryptogram in the Juvencus Manuscript which would have required a knowledge of Latin and Greek.

Life
Cyfeilliog is included in a list of bishops of Llandaff in the twelfth-century Book of Llandaff, but the list is rejected by historians as an attempt to create an implausible unbroken succession of bishops of the diocese. Cyfeilliog is named as a beneficiary in charters of the late ninth and early tenth centuries, but they have no connection with the area of Llandaff. The Anglo-Saxon Chronicle describes him as bishop of Archenfield (English for the Welsh Ergyng), which was then a south-east Welsh territory and is now in Herefordshire.  Ergyng at that date was Welsh in language and custom, but under English rule. Grants which Cyfeilliog received suggest that he was also active in Gwent, and his see probably covered Gwent and Ergyng. Cyfeilliog may have been described by English chroniclers as bishop of Archenfield because he ministered to Welsh people in the area with the approval of the bishop of Hereford, leading English writers to assume that this was his see. All grants which can be securely located are near Caerwent, suggesting that he was probably based in the town. According to a Canterbury list of Professions of Obedience, he was consecrated as a bishop by Æthelred, who was Archbishop of Canterbury between 870 and 888. Historians are uncertain of the validity of the list, but in the 880s Welsh kings accepted Alfred the Great's overlordship, and acknowledgement of the primacy of Canterbury by Welsh bishops at this time would not be unlikely. He may have previously been abbot of Llantwit, although the eighteenth-century source is dubious as well as being late.

The Llandaff Charters record nine grants of land to Cyfeilliog from Hywel ap Rhys, King of Glywysing who died in 886, his son, Arthfael and Brochfael ap Meurig, King of Gwent. King Hywel gave Cyfeilliog two slaves and their progeny in about 885 for the souls of his wife, sons and daughters. A witness called Asser attested this charter immediately after Cyfeilliog, and the Asser who was biographer of Alfred the Great spent a year in Caerwent at this time; it is possible that he was temporarily attached to Cyfeilliog and attested in a position of honour. Around 890, King Arthfael granted Villa Caer Birran, at Treberran, Pencoyd, with four modii (about ) of land to Cyfeilliog. In about 905, there was a disagreement between his familia (household) and that of King Brochfael. Cyfeilliog was awarded an "insult price" "in puro auro" (in pure gold) of the worth of his face, lengthwise and breadthwise. Around five years later, there was a dispute between Cyfeilliog and Brochfael about a church in Monmouth and its territory, and judgement was again given in Cyfeilliog's favour. 

A cryptogram in the Juvencus Manuscript, which was written in Wales in the second half of the ninth century, praises a priest called Cemelliauc, which is Old Welsh for the Modern Welsh name Cyfeilliog. Such cryptogams usually contained the names of their authors, and this one was probably about Bishop Cyfeilliog as his name was uncommon and he is only known person with that name who was active when the Juvencus Manuscript was being written. The cryptogram is in Latin, with each letter being the Greek for the number of the letter in the Latin alphabet. There are no errors in Greek in the cryptogram, and would have been very difficult to achieve unless the writer knew the language, which was an unusual accomplishment in the period. The cryptogram is described by the scholar Helen McKee as "charmingly boastful", and it reads in translation, with some words missing due to deterioration of the manuscript at the edge of the page:
Cemelliauc the learned priest
[             ] this without any trouble
To God, brothers, constantly,
Pray for me [                 ].

In 914 Cyfeilliog was captured by the Vikings, and the event was recorded in the Anglo-Saxon Chronicle:
In this year a great naval force came over here from the south from Brittany, and two earls, Ohter and Hroald, with them. And they went west round the coast so that they arrived at the Severn Estuary and ravaged in Wales everywhere along the coast where it suited them. And they captured Cyfeilliog, bishop of Archenfield, and took him with them to the ships; and then King Edward ransomed him for 40 pounds.

Edward the Elder's decision to pay Cuyfeilliog's ransom shows that he continued his father's patronage of the southern Welsh.

Death
Cyfeilliog died in 927 according to the twelfth-century Book of Llandaff. The date is accepted by the historian Thomas Charles-Edwards, Wendy Davies and Patrick Sims-Williams are sceptical of the date as they regard it as late for someone consecrated by Archbishop Æthelred. He was probably succeeded by Libiau (also spelled Llibio). Most bishops in the eighth and ninth centuries appear to have been active in both Gwent and Ergyng, but Cyfeilliog's successors seem to have only ministered in Gwent. Bishops of Hereford may have taken over in Ergyng.

Notes

References

Bibliography

 
 

 

9th-century Welsh bishops
10th-century Welsh bishops